Timothy James Gordon Eliott (25 March 1935 – 22 April 2011) was a New Zealand actor.

Biography
Eliott was born in Eltham, South Taranaki, New Zealand on 25 March 1935. His mother died when he was one and he was brought up by aunts and grandparents until he joined his father in England after the war where he went to public schools in Bath and Bristol. He returned to New Zealand in 1950.

He became an actor by accident when in 1955 he accompanied a colleague to auditions for Nola Millar's production of Richard II with the Thespians company and ended up being cast as Bolingbroke in which he was very well received.  He went on to appear as Worthy in Virtue in Danger for the New Zealand Players and Jimmy Porter in Look Back in Anger for Unity Theatre as well as appearing in radio drama and commercials.

In 1964, Eliott was one of the founders of Downstage Theatre in Wellington, and acted in, designed and directed many of the early productions.

He emigrated to Australia in 1968 where, in concurrent productions for the Old Tote Theatre Company in 1969, he played Hamlet in Shakespeare's "Hamlet" and Guildenstern in Tom Stoppard's "Rosencrantz and Guildenstern are Dead" before going on to a fruitful acting career in television and film and as a voice-over artist. (In the mid 1970s he had a continuing role as a sports reporter in the Crawford Productions series "The Box".)

He returned briefly to New Zealand in 1983 to play Colonel Elliot in Utu directed by Geoff Murphy.

Eliott died in Wentworth Falls, New South Wales, on 22 April 2011.

Filmography

Shirley Thompson vs. the Aliens (1972) – George Talbot
Avengers of the Reef (1973) – Kemp
Journey Among Women (1977) – Doctor Hargreaves
Prisoner (1979) – Ken Roberts
A Toast to Melba (1980)
The Last Outlaw (1980) – Sgt. Steele
A Country Practice (Serial TV) (1981) – Douglas McKenzie / Roy Roach / Laurie Walker
Runaway Island (Serial TV) (1982)
Sons and Daughters (Serial TV) (1882) – Brian Ingleton / Nat Fisher
The Adventures of Huckleberry Finn (TV) (1982) – Richard Casey
The Dismissal (1983) – Sir Fredrick Wheeler
On the Run (1983) – Armourer
Utu (1984) – Col. Elliot
The Last Bastion (1984) – Richard Casey
Five Mile Creek (Serial TV) (1984) – Mr. Sykes
A Halo for Athuan (1984) – Father Bernard
Winners  (1985) – Simon
Treasure Island (1987)
The Odyssey  (1987) – Capt. Fitzwater
Great Expectations, the Untold Story (1987) – Capt. Fitzwater
The Right Hand Man (1987) – Lord Ironminster
Rob Roy (1987) – Lord Ironminster
Captain James Cook (1988) – Earl of Morton
Joe Wilson (1988) – Jack Barnes
Mission: Impossible (Serial TV) (1988) – Horace Selim
Young Einstein (1988) – Lecturer
G.P. (1989) – Professor Mick Curnow
Police Rescue (Serial TV) (1991) – Sir Maurice Wells
Snowy River: The McGregor Saga (Serial TV) – Arnold Rule
Water Rats (Serial TV) (1996) – Laurie Parsons
Murder Call (Serial TV) (1997) – Arthur Smith
Auf der Suche nach der Schatzinsel (Serial TV) (1998) – Trader Scout / Stevenson
Moulin Rouge! (2001) – Audience Member (uncredited)
Dr Mermaid and the Abovemarine (2009) – Narrator (voice)

References

External links

1935 births
2011 deaths
New Zealand male television actors
New Zealand male voice actors
New Zealand male stage actors
New Zealand emigrants to Australia
People from Eltham, New Zealand